SS Hat Creek was a Type T2-SE-A1 tanker built at Alabama Drydock and Shipbuilding Company of Mobile, Alabama in July 1943. She was built as hull number 251 and USMC number 5354. She was sold in 1946 to National Bulk Carriers and a year later had a new two cylinder steam turbine installed. In 1957 she had a new middle section installed and was renamed Amoco Virginia. Subsequent renamings included Point Judy (1979) and Point Milton (1980).

Parts of the middle section were converted into deck barges and named Venemac 5 and Venemac 6.

References
 T2 Tanker site: Alabama Drydock and Shipbuilding Co. Tankers 1942-1945

 

Type T2-SE-A1 tankers
Ships built in Mobile, Alabama
1943 ships
World War II tankers of the United States